Alessia Pavese (born 15 July 1998) is an Italian sprinter bronze medal at the 2022 European Athletics Championships with the relay team.

Career
Pavese in her career at youth level in the 200 metres was 6th at the 2015 World Youth Championships in Athletics in Cali, eliminated in heats at the 2017 European Athletics U20 Championships in Grosseto, semifinalist at the 2019 European Athletics U23 Championships in Gävle.

She at the senior level won the bronze medal in the 4 × 100 metres relay at the 2022 European Athletics Championships in Munich.

Achievements

See also
 Italian national track relay team
 Italian all-time lists - 4x100 metres relay

References

External links
 

1998 births
Living people
Italian female sprinters
Athletics competitors of Centro Sportivo Aeronautica Militare
European Championships (multi-sport event) bronze medalists
European Athletics Championships medalists
20th-century Italian people
21st-century Italian people